Île d'Yeu Aerodrome or Aérodrome d'Ile d'Yeu - Grand Phare  is an airport located 3.5 km east of Port-Joinville on the island of Île d'Yeu, a commune of the Vendée département in the Pays de la Loire région of France.

Airlines and destinations

Statistics

References

External links 
 Aérodrome d'Ile d'Yeu - Grand Phare (Union des Aéroports Français) 
 

Airports in Pays de la Loire